, officially called the , is a stadium located in Nagai Park, Higashisumiyoshi-ku, Osaka, Japan. It plays host to J.League association football, Japan Rugby League One and X-League American football games. The 24,481 seat stadium is the third stadium in the Nagai Complex along with Nagai Stadium and Nagai Aid Stadium.

Thus, the stadium became the "". Kincho also became the shirt sponsor for Cerezo Osaka.

See also
Nagai Park
Nagai Stadium
Nagai Aid Stadium

References

External links
 World Stadiums entry

Rugby union stadiums in Japan
American football venues in Japan
Football venues in Japan
Sports venues in Osaka
Higashisumiyoshi-ku, Osaka
Cerezo Osaka
1987 establishments in Japan
Sports venues completed in 1987